WWE Judgment Day was a professional wrestling pay-per-view (PPV) event produced by World Wrestling Entertainment (WWE), a professional wrestling promotion based in Connecticut. It was first held as the 25th In Your House PPV in October 1998. The event was then brought back as its own PPV in May 2000, replacing Over the Edge. Judgment Day continued as the annual May PPV until the final event in 2009. To coincide with the brand extension, the event was made exclusive to the SmackDown brand from 2004 to 2006. Following WrestleMania 23 in April 2007, brand-exclusive PPVs were discontinued. In 2010, Judgment Day was replaced by Over the Limit.

History
Judgment Day was first held as an In Your House pay-per-view (PPV) event. In Your House was a series of monthly PPVs first produced by the World Wrestling Federation (WWF, now WWE) in May 1995. They aired when the promotion was not holding one of its major PPVs and were sold at a lower cost. Judgment Day: In Your House was the 25th In Your House event and took place on October 18, 1998, at the Rosemont Horizon in Rosemont, Illinois.

The In Your House branding was retired following February 1999's St. Valentine's Day Massacre: In Your House. As a result of the death of WWF wrestler Owen Hart at 1999's Over the Edge PPV, which was held in May, the Over the Edge PPV chronology was canceled and Judgment Day was reinstated as its own PPV the following year, being held on May 21, 2000, at Freedom Hall in Louisville, Kentucky. This second Judgment Day event established Judgment Day as the promotion's annual May PPV.

In May 2002, the WWF was renamed to World Wrestling Entertainment (WWE) as a result of a lawsuit from the World Wildlife Fund over the "WWF" initialism. Judgment Day 2002 was in turn the very first PPV produced by the promotion to be held under the WWE name.

In March 2002, the promotion held a draft that split its roster into two distinctive brands of wrestling, Raw and SmackDown!, where wrestlers were exclusively assigned to perform—a third brand, ECW, was added in 2006. Both the 2002 and 2003 Judgment Day events featured wrestlers from both the Raw and SmackDown! brands. The 2003 event was also the final event to not be brand-exclusive until Backlash 2007. Judgment Day from 2004 to 2006 exclusively featured wrestlers from the SmackDown! brand. Following WrestleMania 23 in April 2007, WWE discontinued brand-exclusive PPVs, thus the events from 2007 to 2009 featured wrestlers from the Raw, SmackDown, and ECW brands. The 2009 event was the final Judgment Day PPV held, as the event was discontinued and replaced by Over the Limit in 2010.

In 2022, WWE reused the name for Edge's new stable, The Judgment Day.

Events

See also
 List of WWE pay-per-view events
 WWE Over the Limit
 WWF Over the Edge

References

External links
Official Judgment Day website

 
Recurring events established in 1998
Recurring events disestablished in 2009